W.C. Wetzel State Recreation Area is an undeveloped  recreation area, located in Macomb County, Michigan.

Activities
 Cross Country Skiing
 Hiking
 Hunting
 Radio Controlled Flying
 Snowmobiling

External links
W.C. Wetzel State Recreation Area Michigan Department of Natural Resources
Wetzel State Recreation Area Protected Planet (World Database on Protected Areas)
Friends of Wetzel State Recreation Area

Protected areas of Macomb County, Michigan
State recreation areas of Michigan